Gerald Eastmure (24 January 1917 – 31 December 1996) was an English cricketer. He was a right-handed batsman and wicket-keeper who played for Assam. He was born in Ealing and died in Mauritius.

Eastmure made two appearances for the team in the Ranji Trophy, scoring 5 runs on his debut in an innings defeat against Holkar, and in his second match, two seasons later, scoring 22 and 36 runs.

External links
Gerald Eastmure at Cricket Archive 

1917 births
1996 deaths
English cricketers
Assam cricketers
Wicket-keepers